The Battle of Jerusalem Plank Road, also known as the First Battle of the Weldon Railroad, was a battle of the American Civil War fought June 21–23, 1864, near Petersburg, Virginia. It was the first of a series of battles during the Siege of Petersburg aimed at extending the Union siege lines to the west and cutting the rail lines supplying Petersburg. Two infantry corps of the Union Army of the Potomac attempted to sever the railroad, but were attacked and driven off by the Confederate Army of Northern Virginia's Third Corps, principally the division of Brig. Gen. William Mahone. The inconclusive battle left the Weldon Railroad temporarily in Confederate hands, but the Union Army began to extend its fortifications to the west, starting to increase the pressure of the siege.

Background
After the assaults on Petersburg the previous week failed to capture the city, Lt. Gen. Ulysses S. Grant reluctantly decided on a siege of Petersburg, defended by Gen. Robert E. Lee's Army of Northern Virginia. The Union Army of the Potomac, commanded by Maj. Gen. George G. Meade (although closely supervised by his superior, Grant), entrenched east of the city, running from near the Jerusalem Plank Road (present-day U.S. Route 301, Crater Road) to the Appomattox River.

Grant's first objective was to secure the three remaining open rail lines that served Petersburg and the Confederate capital of Richmond: the Richmond and Petersburg Railroad; the South Side Railroad, which reached to Lynchburg in the west; and the Petersburg Railroad, also called the Petersburg and Weldon Railroad, which led to Weldon, North Carolina, and connected to the Wilmington and Weldon Railroad which led to the Confederacy's only remaining major port, Wilmington, North Carolina. Grant decided on a wide-ranging cavalry raid (the Wilson-Kautz Raid) against the South Side and Weldon railroads, but he also directed that a significant infantry force be sent against the Weldon closer to his current position. Meade selected the II Corps, temporarily commanded by Maj. Gen. David B. Birney while Maj. Gen. Winfield S. Hancock was suffering from his lingering wound incurred at Gettysburg, and the VI Corps, commanded by Maj. Gen. Horatio G. Wright. The positions in the trench lines occupied by these two corps were to be filled in by units of the Army of the James that would be moved from Bermuda Hundred.

As the Union troops were rearranging their lines on June 21 in preparation for their mission against the railroad, they received a surprise visitor, President Abraham Lincoln, who had traveled by water and landed at City Point, Grant's newly established headquarters. He told Grant, "I just thought I would jump aboard a boat and come down and see you. I don't expect I can do any good, and in fact I'm afraid I may do some harm, but I'll just put myself under your orders and if you find me doing anything wrong just send me right away." After discussing strategy with Grant, Lincoln visited some of the VI Corps troops who would participate in the upcoming battle.

Battle

On June 21, elements of the II Corps probed toward the railroad and skirmished with Confederate cavalry. Difficult terrain—swamps and thickets—slowed their advance and by the morning of June 22, a gap opened up between the two corps. While the II Corps began pivoting as planned, the VI Corps encountered Confederate troops from Maj. Gen. Cadmus Wilcox's division of Lt. Gen. A. P. Hill's corps and they began to entrench rather than advance. Brig. Gen. William Mahone, another division commander in Hill's corps, observed that the gap between the two Union corps was widening, creating a prime target.

Mahone had been a railroad engineer before the war and had personally surveyed this area south of Petersburg, so he was familiar with a ravine that could be used to hide the approach of a Confederate attack column. Robert E. Lee approved Mahone's plan and at 3 p.m. on June 22, Mahone's men emerged in the rear of the II Corps division of Brig. Gen. Francis C. Barlow, catching them by surprise. A soldier wrote, "The attack was to the Union troops more than a surprise. It was an astonishment."

Barlow's division quickly collapsed under the surprise assault. The division of Brig. Gen. John Gibbon, which had erected earthworks, was also surprised by an attack from the rear and many of the regiments ran for safety. Mahone sent an urgent message to Wilcox, asking him to join in the attack; but Wilcox was concerned about the VI Corps men to his front and the two regiments he sent in support arrived too late to make a difference. The II Corps troops rallied around earthworks that they had constructed on the night of June 21 and stabilized their lines. Darkness ended the fighting.

On June 23, the II Corps advanced to retake its lost ground, but the Confederates had pulled back, abandoning the earthworks they had captured. Under orders from General Meade, the VI Corps sent out a heavy skirmish line after 10 a.m. in a second attempt to reach the Weldon Railroad. Men from Brig. Gen. Lewis A. Grant's 1st Vermont Brigade had begun tearing up track when they were attacked by a larger force of Confederate infantry. Numerous Vermonters were taken prisoner and only about half a mile (0.8 km) of track had been destroyed when they were chased away. Meade repeatedly urged Horatio G. Wright to move forward and engage the enemy, but Wright refused to move, concerned that his corps would suffer the same reverses as the II Corps the previous day. At 7:35 p.m., Meade gave up and told Wright, "Your delay has been fatal." Meade's aide Theodore Lyman wrote, "On this particular occasion Wright showed himself totally unfit to command a corps."

Aftermath

Union casualties were 2,962, Confederate 572. The battle was inconclusive, with advantages gained on both sides. The Confederates were able to retain control of the Petersburg Railroad. The Federals were able to destroy a short segment of the railroad before being driven off, but more importantly, the siege lines were stretched further to the west, a strategy Grant would continue until the spring of 1865. Other segments of the Petersburg Railroad were destroyed by the Wilson-Kautz Raid and more would fall to the Union Army during the Battle of Globe Tavern (or the Second Battle of the Weldon Railroad) in August, although Lee could ship supplies by wagon from the Weldon where it reached Stony Creek Station. In an expedition of December 7–11, Maj. Gen. Gouverneur K. Warren destroyed an additional  of track, rendering the Weldon Railroad unable to supply Petersburg.

Notes

References
 Davis, William C., and the Editors of Time-Life Books. Death in the Trenches: Grant at Petersburg. Alexandria, VA: Time-Life Books, 1986. .
 Eicher, David J. The Longest Night: A Military History of the Civil War. New York: Simon & Schuster, 2001. .
 Esposito, Vincent J. West Point Atlas of American Wars. New York: Frederick A. Praeger, 1959. . The collection of maps (without explanatory text) is available online at the West Point website.
 Kennedy, Frances H., ed. The Civil War Battlefield Guide. 2nd ed. Boston: Houghton Mifflin Co., 1998. .
 Salmon, John S. The Official Virginia Civil War Battlefield Guide. Mechanicsburg, PA: Stackpole Books, 2001. .
 Trudeau, Noah Andre. The Last Citadel: Petersburg, Virginia, June 1864 – April 1865. El Dorado Hills: Savas Beatie LLC, 2014. .
 National Park Service battle description
 CWSAC Report Update

Further reading
 Cross, David Faris. A Melancholy Affair at the Weldon Railroad: The Vermont Brigade, June 23, 1864. White Mane Publishing Company, 2003. .
 Greene, A. Wilson. A Campaign of Giants: The Battle for Petersburg. Vol. 1: From the Crossing of the James to the Crater. Chapel Hill: University of North Carolina Press, 2018. .

External links

   
 John Horn Map of Jerusalem Plank Road: June 22, 1864

Jerusalem Plank Road
Jerusalem Plank Road
Jerusalem Plank Road
1864 in Virginia
Jerusalem Plank Road
Jerusalem Plank Road
Jerusalem Plank Road
June 1864 events